Glomera is a genus of orchids (family Orchidaceae), with more than 130 species. They are native to Laos, Indonesia, the Philippines, New Guinea and Melanesia.

The genera Ischnocentrum Schltr. and Sepalosiphon Schltr. are synonyms of this genus.

Species 

 Glomera acicularis  Schltr. (1912)
 Glomera acuminata  J.J.Sm. (1911)
 Glomera acutiflora  (Schltr.) J.J.Sm. (1912)
 Glomera adenandroides  (Schltr.) J.J.Sm. (1912)
 Glomera adenocarpa  (Schltr.) J.J.Sm. (1912)
 Glomera affinis  J.J.Sm. (1912)
 Glomera albiviridis  P.Royen (1979)
 Glomera amboinensis  (Ridl.) J.J.Sm. (1908)
 Glomera angiensis  J.J.Sm. (1917)
 Glomera asperata  Schltr. (1922)
 Glomera aurea  Schltr. (1912)
 Glomera bambusiformis  Schltr. (1912)
 Glomera bismarckiensis  J.J.Sm. (1912)
 Glomera bougainvilleana  Ormerod (1995)
 Glomera brachychaete  (Schltr.) J.J.Sm. (1912)
 Glomera brevipetala  J.J.Sm. (1911)
 Glomera calocephala  Schltr. (1921)
 Glomera carnea  J.J.Sm. (1910)
 Glomera carolinensis  L.O.Williams (1939)
 Glomera celebica  (Schltr.) J.J.Sm. (1912)
 Glomera compressa  J.J.Sm. (1911)
 Glomera confusa  J.J.Sm. (1912)
 Glomera conglutinata  J.J.Sm. (1911)
 Glomera cyatheicola  P.Royen (1979)
 Glomera dekockii  J.J.Sm. (1911)
 Glomera dentifera  J.J.Sm. (1908)
 Glomera dependens  (Schltr.) J.J.Sm. (1912)
 Glomera diosmoides  (Schltr.) J.J.Sm. (1912)
 Glomera dischorensis  (Schltr.) J.J.Sm. (1912)
 Glomera distichifolia  Ormerod (1996)
 Glomera dubia  J.J.Sm. (1914)
 Glomera elegantula  (Schltr.) J.J.Sm. (1908)
 Glomera emarginata  Kores (1989)
 Glomera ericifolia  Ridl. (1916)
 Glomera erythrosma  Blume (1825) 
 Glomera flaccida  (Schltr.) J.J.Sm. (1912)
 Glomera flammula  Schltr. (1912)
 Glomera fransseniana  J.J.Sm. (1914)
 Glomera fruticula  J.J.Sm. (1911)
 Glomera fruticulosa  Schltr. (1912)
 Glomera fusca  (Schltr.) J.J.Sm. (1934)
 Glomera gamosepalata  P.Royen (1979)
 Glomera geelvinkensis  J.J.Sm. (1915)
 Glomera glomeroides  (Schltr.) J.J.Sm. (1912)
 Glomera goliathensis  J.J.Sm. (1911)
 Glomera graminifolia  Schltr. (1922)
 Glomera grandiflora  J.J.Sm. (1910)
 Glomera hamadryas  (Schltr.) J.J.Sm. (1908)
 Glomera hubrechtiana  J.J.Sm. (1929)
 Glomera hunsteiniana  (Schltr.) J.J.Sm. (1934)
 Glomera imitans  (Schltr.) J.J.Sm. (1912)
 Glomera inconspicua  J.J.Sm. (1935)
 Glomera inflata  (Schltr.) J.J.Sm. (1934)
 Glomera jabiensis  J.J.Sm. (1915)
 Glomera kaniensis  Schltr. (1912)
 Glomera kanke  P.Royen (1979)
 Glomera keytsiana  J.J.Sm. (1913)
 Glomera lancipetala  J.J.Sm. (1928)
 Glomera latilinguis  J.J.Sm. (1910)
 Glomera latipetala  (Schltr.) J.J.Sm. (1912)
 Glomera ledermannii  (Schltr.) J.J.Sm. (1934)
 Glomera leucomela  (Schltr.) J.J.Sm. (1912)
 Glomera longa  (Schltr.) J.J.Sm. (1912)
 Glomera longicaulis  J.J.Sm. (1915)
 Glomera macdonaldii  (Schltr.) Ames (1933)
 Glomera macrantha  J.J.Sm. (1912)
 Glomera macrophylla  Schltr. (1922)
 Glomera manicata  J.J.Sm. (1910)
 Glomera melanocaulon  Schltr. (1912)
 Glomera merrillii  Ames  1914)
 Glomera microphylla  J.J.Sm. (1914)
 Glomera minutigibba  J.J.Sm. (1929)
 Glomera montana  Rchb.f. (1876)
 Glomera myrtillus  (Schltr.) Schuit. & de Vogel (2003)
 Glomera nana  (Schltr.) J.J.Sm. (1912)
 Glomera neohibernica  Schltr. (1905)
 Glomera nigrilimbata  P.Royen (1979)
 Glomera obovata  (Schltr.) J.J.Sm. (1912)
 Glomera obtusa  Schltr. (1912)
 Glomera oligantha  Schltr. (1919)
 Glomera palustris  J.J.Sm. (1911)
 Glomera parviflora  J.J.Sm. (1912)
 Glomera patens  Schltr. (1922)
 Glomera pensilis  (Schltr.) J.J.Sm. (1912)
 Glomera pilifera  (Schltr.) J.J.Sm. (1908)
 Glomera platypetala  Schltr. (1912)
 Glomera pleiotricha  J.J.Sm. (1929)
 Glomera plumosa  J.J.Sm. (1928)
 Glomera polychaete  (Schltr.) J.J.Sm. (1912)
 Glomera pseudomonanthos  Ormerod (2005)
 Glomera pteropetala  (Schltr.) J.J.Sm. (1934)
 Glomera pullei  J.J.Sm. (1914)
 Glomera pumilio  J.J.Sm. (1928)
 Glomera pungens  (Schltr.) J.J.Sm. (1912)
 Glomera retusa  J.J.Sm. (1910)
 Glomera retusimentum  J.J.Sm. (1935)
 Glomera rhombea  J.J.Sm. (1911)
 Glomera rigidula  J.J.Sm. (1912)
 Glomera rubroviridis  J.J.Sm. (1914)
 Glomera saccosepala  J.J.Sm. (1911)
 Glomera salicornioides  J.J.Sm. (1914)
 Glomera salmonea  J.J.Sm. (1914)
 Glomera scandens  J.J.Sm. (1911)
 Glomera schlechteriana  Mansf. (1929)
 Glomera schultzei  Schltr. (1922)
 Glomera secunda  J.J.Sm. (1928)
 Glomera sepalosiphon  Schuit. & de Vogel (2003)
 Glomera similis  J.J.Sm. (1917)
 Glomera sororia  J.J.Sm. (1917)
 Glomera squamulosa  (Schltr.) J.J.Sm. (1908)
 Glomera stenocentron  (Schltr.) J.J.Sm. (1912)
 Glomera subeciliata  J.J.Sm. (1929)
 Glomera sublaevis  J.J.Sm. (1912)
 Glomera subpetiolata  Schltr. (1912)
 Glomera subracemosa  J.J.Sm. (1910)
 Glomera subulata  (Schltr.) J.J.Sm. (1912)
 Glomera subuliformis  J.J.Sm. (1910)
 Glomera tamiana  J.J.Sm. (1934)
 Glomera tenuis  (Rolfe) J.J.Sm. (1913)
 Glomera terrestris  J.J.Sm. (1911)
 Glomera torricellensis  Schltr.  (1905
 Glomera transitoria  J.J.Sm. (1913)
 Glomera triangularis  J.J.Sm. (1911)
 Glomera uniflora  J.J.Sm. (1908)
 Glomera verrucifera  Schltr. (1912)
 Glomera verrucosissima  (Schltr.) J.J.Sm. (1934)
 Glomera verruculosa  (Schltr.) J.J.Sm. (1912)
 Glomera versteegii  J.J.Sm. (1914)
 Glomera viridis  (Schltr.) J.J.Sm. (1912)

References

External links 
 
 
 TROPICOS entry for Glomera at The Missouri Botanical Garden's website

Arethuseae genera
Coelogyninae